Charles H. Pfennig (January 22, 1871August 13, 1955) was an American businessman and politician.  A Republican, he was the 36th and 41st Mayor of Kenosha, Wisconsin, and represented Kenosha for two years in the Wisconsin State Assembly.

Early life and career
Born in Neenah, Wisconsin, Pfennig was still a small child when his parents moved the family to Kenosha, Wisconsin, in 1873.  He was educated in public and parochial schools of Kenosha and worked for most his young adulthood in a retail grocery business owned by his father.  In the 1890s, Pfennig became involved with the local volunteer fire department.  He became an agent of the Queen Insurance Company, selling fire insurance, and, in 1898, he started his own insurance business.  His company would soon expand into real estate, and he would end up running the company—known as Charles H. Pfennig, Inc.—for the rest of his life.

Political career
Pfennig became increasingly involved in local affairs as a member of the board of the YMCA.  He joined the Republican Party of Wisconsin and began running for local offices on the Republican ticket.  He was an unsuccessful candidate for City Treasurer in 1897 and 1898, but was elected to the City Council in 1900.

After only one term on the city council, in 1902, Pfennig was chosen at the Republican city convention as their candidate for Mayor of Kenosha.  Pfennig initially declined the nomination, but accepted after their next choice, Thomas Hansen, also refused.  His opponent was incumbent James Gorman, then in his third term as mayor.  Pfennig prevailed by a margin of 75 votes in the April election and was inaugurated on April 14, 1902.  Gorman returned to run again in 1904, and this time defeated Pfennig.  In 1906, however, Pfennig ran for office again, and was narrowly elected to a two-year term as Sheriff of Kenosha County.  He did not run for reelection as sheriff in 1908, but was appointed to the city police board after leaving office.

In 1912, Pfennig was the Republican nominee for Wisconsin State Assembly in the Kenosha County district.  He challenged incumbent state representative Mathias J. Scholey, who had also recently served as Mayor of Kenosha.

One of the significant animating issues in the 1912 election was the new state income tax.  The income tax—the first in the United States—was created mainly to more equitably distribute the tax burden which had previously fallen almost entirely on farmers and large landowners who bore the brunt of the property tax.  It had been approved by referendum in 1908 and was extremely popular among the more rural counties, but was notably extremely unpopular in more urban, industrialized commercial centers like Kenosha.

The income tax was supported by Republican Governor Francis E. McGovern, but was vehemently opposed by both Pfennig and his Democratic opponent.  A Kenosha County straw poll taken a month before the election showed strong support for Pfennig despite McGovern running well behind his Democratic opponent and the Republican presidential nominee, William H. Taft, running third behind Woodrow Wilson and Theodore Roosevelt.  True to the polls, Pfennig prevailed in the November general election taking 54% of the county vote.  Due to his stance on the income tax, Pfennig was expected to take a lead role in the effort to repeal the tax.  This effort was ultimately unsuccessful and the Wisconsin income tax became a model for the federal income tax, passed in 1914.

In the Assembly, he was chairman of the Committee on Printing and served on the Committee on Labor.

In 1916, he was elected to another term as Mayor of Kenosha.  During World War I, he served as chairman of the Kenosha draft board.

In 1928 Pfennig was again elected to the Kenosha Common Council and was chosen as president of the council in 1930.

Personal life and family

Pfennig married Ruth Ann Shields on January 25, 1905.  They had one son, Frederick, and three daughters.  She died just a month before him, in June 1955.  Charles Pfennig died at Kenosha Hospital on August 13, 1955, after an illness.  At the time of his death he had seven grandchildren and one great grandchild.

His son, Frederick S. Pfennig, was also a politician. He represented Kenosha in the Wisconsin State Assembly from 1941 to 1949 and was Republican assistant floor leader in the Assembly for the 1947 session.

In addition to his insurance and real estate business, Pfennig was invested in the Terrace Court Corporation, was a director of the Brown National Bank, and was president of the Greenridge Cemetery Association.  He was also a member of the Kenosha Salvation Army, the Benevolent and Protective Order of Elks, Modern Woodmen of America, and Rotary International.

Electoral history

Kenosha Treasurer (1897, 1898)

| colspan="6" style="text-align:center;background-color: #e9e9e9;"| General Election, April 6, 1897

| colspan="6" style="text-align:center;background-color: #e9e9e9;"| General Election, April 5, 1898

Kenosha City Council (1900)

| colspan="6" style="text-align:center;background-color: #e9e9e9;"| General Election, April 3, 1900

Kenosha Mayor (1902, 1904)

| colspan="6" style="text-align:center;background-color: #e9e9e9;"| General Election, April 1, 1902

| colspan="6" style="text-align:center;background-color: #e9e9e9;"| General Election, April 5, 1904

Kenosha Sheriff (1906)

| colspan="6" style="text-align:center;background-color: #e9e9e9;"| General Election, November 6, 1906

Wisconsin Assembly (1912)

| colspan="6" style="text-align:center;background-color: #e9e9e9;"| Republican Primary, September 3, 1912

| colspan="6" style="text-align:center;background-color: #e9e9e9;"| General Election, November 5, 1912

References

External links
 

1871 births
1955 deaths
Politicians from Neenah, Wisconsin
Businesspeople from Wisconsin
Mayors of Kenosha, Wisconsin
Wisconsin city council members
Wisconsin sheriffs
Republican Party members of the Wisconsin State Assembly